Gold thread or 'goldthread may refer to:

Gold thread, very fine wire made of gold
Goldthread, a common name of Coptis, a genus of flowering plant in the buttercup family (Ranunculaceae)